Omega Phi Alpha may refer to:
Omega Phi Alpha, a national service sorority
 A local fraternity which became a now inactive chapter of Delta Upsilon at University of the Pacific (United States)
 A local fraternity at Polytechnic University (New York)